The 2006–07 North West Counties Football League season was the 25th in the history of the North West Counties Football League, a football competition in England. Teams were divided into two divisions: Division One and Division Two.

Division One 

Division One featured three new teams:

 F.C. United of Manchester promoted as champions of Division Two
 Flixton promoted as runners up of Division Two
 Nelson promoted as third in Division Two

League table

Division Two 

Division Two featured three new teams:

 Ashton Athletic promoted as 4th in the Manchester League
 Bootle promoted from the Liverpool County Football Combination
 Runcorn Linnets as a new team

League table

References

 https://web.archive.org/web/20110630024327/http://www.nwcfl.com/archives/previous-league-tables/2006-07.htm

External links 
 NWCFL Official Site

North West Counties Football League seasons
9